Strain is a 2020 Nigerian drama film directed by Uduak-Obong Patrick and produced by Benjamin Abejide Adeniran with Oluwatoyin Adewumi as the executive producer. The film stars Okey Uzoeshi, Shushu Abubakar, Alex Usifo, Gloria Anozie, Chinonso Ejemba, Bimbo Akintola, Sharon Santos and written by Donald Tombia, Oluwatoyin Adewumi and Eze Ekpo. In 2020, it won the award for the Best International Film 2020 at the Urban Film Festival in Miami, USA and 2021 Best Screenplay film at the 2021 edition of The African Film Festival (TAFF).

Plot  
The theme of the film revolves around 6-years old Ekene who was suddenly diagnosed with Sickle Cell Disease and how the family struggles to keep their peace and unity after.

Cast 

 Okey Uzoeshi as Nnamdi Ezeji
 Shushu Abubakar as Yemi Ezeji
 Angel Unigwe as Ebere Ezeji
 Nifemi Lawal as Ekene Ezeji
 Alex Usifo Omiagbo as Grandpa Ezeji
 Gloria Anozie as Grandma Ezeji
 Chinonso Ejemba as Dr. Hassan
 Bimbo Akintola as Genetic Counsellor
 Saphirre Ekeng as Young Ebere
 Kosi Ogboruche as Young Ekene
 Henry Diabuah as Osas
 Toluwanimi Olaoye as Somto
 Olanrewaju Adeyemi as Principal
 Enkay Ogboruche as Mrs. Ify Chukwuka
 Bade Smart as MMM Competition Compere
 Nnenna Udeh as Chemistry Teacher
 Raphael Jackson as Ayomide
 Omotola Adeseluka as Ekene's Class Teacher
 Toluwalase Adewumi as Ebere's Friend
 Babara Ogunniyi as Ebere's Friend
 Sharon Santos as Ebere's Friend
 Benjamin Abejide Adeniran as Usman
 Titilope Ojuola as Secretary

References

External links 

 
 

Nigerian drama films
2020 films
2020 drama films
English-language Nigerian films
2020s English-language films